Neoguraleus is a genus of sea snails, marine gastropod mollusks in the family Mangeliidae.

Species
Species within the genus Neoguraleus include:
 Neoguraleus amoenus (E. A. Smith, 1884)
 Neoguraleus benthicolus Powell, 1942 
 † Neoguraleus deceptus Powell, 1942 
 † Neoguraleus filiferus Darragh, 2017 
 Neoguraleus finlayi Powell, 1942 
 † Neoguraleus hautotaraensis Vella, 1954 
 Neoguraleus huttoni (E. A. Smith, 1915)
 Neoguraleus interruptus Powell, 1942 
 † Neoguraleus lineatus (Marwick, 1928) 
 Neoguraleus lyallensis (Murdoch, 1905)
 Neoguraleus manukauensis Powell, 1942 
 † Neoguraleus morgani (Marwick, 1924) 
 Neoguraleus murdochi  (Finlay, 1924)
 † Neoguraleus ngatuturaensis (Bartrum & Powell, 1928) 
 Neoguraleus nukumaruensis  Powell, 1942 
 Neoguraleus oruaensis Powell, 1942 
 † Neoguraleus protensus (Hutton, 1885) 
 Neoguraleus sandersonae (Bucknill, 1928)
 Neoguraleus sinclairi (Gillies, 1882)
 † Neoguraleus waihuaensis Powell, 1942 
Taxon inquirendum
 Neoguraleus trizonata (E. A. Smith, 1882)
 Species brought into synonymy
 Neoguraleus amoena [sic] : synonym of Neoguraleus amoenus (E. A. Smith, 1884)
 Neoguraleus benthicola [sic]: synonym of Neoguraleus benthicolus Powell, 1942 
 Neoguraleus sinclairi (Smith, 1884): synonym of Neoguraleus finlayi Powell, 1942 
 Neoguraleus tenebrosus Powell, 1926: synonym of Neoguraleus lyallensis (Murdoch, 1905)
 Neoguraleus whangaroaensis A.W.B. Powell, 1942: synonym of Neoguraleus sinclairi (T.B. Gillies, 1882)

References

 Bouchet P., Kantor Yu.I., Sysoev A. & Puillandre N. (2011) A new operational classification of the Conoidea. Journal of Molluscan Studies 77: 273-308.

External links
  Tucker, J.K. 2004 Catalog of recent and fossil turrids (Mollusca: Gastropoda). Zootaxa 682:1-1295.
 Worldwide Mollusk Data base : Mangeliidae

 
Gastropod genera